A dollar coin is a coin valued at one dollar in a given currency.

Examples include:

 Australian one dollar coin
 Canadian one dollar coin, or Loonie
 Canadian silver dollar
 Hong Kong one-dollar coin
 New Zealand one dollar coin
 Dollar coin (United States)
 Spanish milled dollar

See also
 Half dollar (United States coin)